The 20913/20914 Rajkot–Delhi Sarai Rohilla Weekly Superfast Express is a Superfast train belonging to Western Railway zone that runs between  and  in India. It is currently being operated with 20913/20914 train numbers on a weekly basis.

Coach composition

The train has standard ICF rakes with max speed of 110 kmph. The train consists of 23 coaches:

 1 AC II Tier
 5 AC III Tier
 11 Sleeper coaches
 4 General Unreserved
 2 Seating cum Luggage Rake

Service

The 20913/Rajkot–Delhi Sarai Rohilla Weekly Superfast Express has an average speed of 57 km/hr and covers 1107 km in 19 hrs 20 mins.

The 20914/Delhi Sarai Rohilla–Rajkot Weekly Superfast Express has an average speed of 56 km/hr and covers 1107 km in 19 hrs 40 mins.

Route and halts 

The important halts of the train are:

Schedule

Traction

Both trains are hauled by a Vatva Loco Shed-based WDM-3A  or WDM-3D diesel locomotive from Rajkot to Delhi and vice versa.

Rake sharing

The train shares its rake with 22937/22938 Rajkot–Rewa Superfast Express.

See also 

 Delhi Sarai Rohilla railway station
 Rajkot Junction railway station
 Rajkot–Rewa Superfast Express

Notes

References

External links 

 20913/Rajkot–Delhi Sarai Rohilla Weekly Superfast Express India Rail Info
 20914/Delhi Sarai Rohilla–Rajkot Weekly Superfast Express India Rail Info

Transport in Rajkot
Transport in Delhi
Express trains in India
Rail transport in Rajasthan
Rail transport in Gujarat
Rail transport in Haryana
Rail transport in Delhi
Railway services introduced in 2014